Didier Virvaleix (born 21 September 1966) is a French racing cyclist. He rode in the 1991 Tour de France.

References

1966 births
Living people
French male cyclists
Place of birth missing (living people)